Leptotes unicolor is a species of orchid native to Brazil, Argentina and Paraguay.

References

External links 

unicolor
Orchids of Argentina
Orchids of Brazil
Flora of Paraguay